Japanese corporation System Sacom
 Students & Scholars Against Corporate Misbehaviour